KEC may refer to:
 Kaohsiung Exhibition Center, Taiwan
 Kathmandu Engineering College, Nepal
 KEC80, a weather radio station
 KEC International, a power company, Mumbai, India
 Kentucky Exposition Center, Louisville, US
 Kress Events Center, an athletics facility in Green Bay, Wisconsin, US